Arda is given name.

In Turkey, it is used as a masculine name. In Turkish, Arda means sceptre, a stick planted in the ground to mark a spot, latter (successor), the Arda river (an important tributary of the Maritsa in the Edirne region), a very old Turkic name in Uyghur writings.

In Armenia, it is a feminine given name. It is likewise found as a feminine name among the Somali people.

It is also a given name of Old English origin.

Given name
Arda of Armenia, a queen of Jerusalem
Arda Akbulut (born 2001), Turkish footballer
Arda Bowser (1899–1996), American footballer
Arda Collins, American poet of Armenian descent
Arda Denkel (1949–2000), Turkish philosopher
Arda Green (1899–1958), American biochemist 
Arda Güler (born 2005), Turkish footballer
Arda Kural (born 1980), Turkish actor
Arda Mandikian (1924–2009), Greek Armenian opera singer
Arda Ocal (born 1981), Turkish-Canadian TV and radio broadcaster 
Arda Turan (born 1987), Turkish footballer
Arda Vekiloğlu (born 1979), Turkish basketball player
Kemal Arda Gürdal (born 1990), Turkish swimmer

Surname
Ben Arda (1929–2006), Filipino professional golfer
H. Efsun Arda, Turkish developmental and systems biologist
Yasemin Arda (born 1978), Turkish-Belgian management scientist and operations researcher

References

English feminine given names
Turkish masculine given names